The 2014 Mid-Eastern Athletic Conference baseball tournament began on May 14 and ended on May 19 at Marty L. Miller Field, on the campus of Norfolk State University in Norfolk, Virginia.  It was an eight-team double elimination tournament.   won their fourteenth tournament championship to claim the Mid-Eastern Athletic Conference's automatic bid to the 2014 NCAA Division I baseball tournament.  Bethune-Cookman has claimed fourteen of the sixteen tournament championships, with Savannah State winning in 2013 and North Carolina A&T earning the 2005 title.

Format and seeding
The four teams in the North Division and top four finishers from the South Division were seeded one through four based on regular season records, with first round matchups of the top seed from the North and the fourth seed from the South, the second seed from the North against the third seed from the South, and so on.  The winners advanced in the winners' bracket, while first round losers play elimination games.  The format means that one team from the South, was left out of the field.

Rain forced adjustments in the schedule, with all three third round games postponed by one day to Saturday.

Bracket

All-Tournament Team
The following players were named to the All-Tournament Team.

Most Outstanding Performer
Montana Durapau was named Tournament Most Outstanding Performer.  Durapau was a pitcher for Bethune-Cookman.

References

Tournament
Mid-Eastern Athletic Conference Baseball Tournament
Mid-Eastern Athletic Conference baseball tournament
Mid-Eastern Athletic Conference Baseball